is a Japanese football player who plays for Ehime FC.

National team career
He was selected in the national squad for the 2011 Asian Cup finals as a late replacement for injured Gotoku Sakai.

Career statistics

Club

1Includes Japanese Super Cup, J.League Championship and FIFA Club World Cup.

International

Honours

Club
 Sanfrecce Hiroshima
J1 League (1) : 2012
J2 League (1) : 2008
Japanese Super Cup (1) : 2008

 Urawa Reds
AFC Champions League (1): 2017
J.League Cup (1): 2016

Japan
AFC Asian Cup (1) : 2011
EAFF East Asian Cup (1) : 2013

References

External links

 
 Japan National Football Team Database
 
 
 Profile at Urawa Reds
 Yahoo! Sports Profile

1986 births
Living people
Association football people from Hiroshima Prefecture
Japanese footballers
Japan international footballers
J1 League players
J2 League players
J3 League players
Sanfrecce Hiroshima players
Ehime FC players
Urawa Red Diamonds players
Kyoto Sanga FC players
2011 AFC Asian Cup players
AFC Asian Cup-winning players
Association football defenders